Nkange is a village located in the Central District of Botswana. It had 3,550 inhabitants at the 2011 census.

See also
 List of cities in Botswana

References

Populated places in Botswana
Villages in Botswana